Ricardo Acevedo Bernal (4 May 1867 – 7 April 1930) was a Colombian portrait painter, composer and photographer.

Biography
Later, he went to New York and remained for eight years, working at various photography studios. While there, he became a member of the "Art Students League" and worked with William Merritt Chase.

He returned to Colombia in 1898, where he devoted himself to creating religious murals at several churches, became a Professor at the Escuela and established his own art school in 1901.

In 1902, he went to Paris to study at the Académie Julian with Léon Bonnat and Tony Robert-Fleury. Upon his return, he was awarded a medal at an exposition celebrating 100 years of Colombian independence. Between 1911 and 1918, he was the Director of the Escuela Nacional and founded the art gallery at the Museo Nacional de Colombia. In addition to his portraits of historical figures and current notables, he was also a lover of Colombian folk music and composed several pasillos.

In 1928, President Miguel Abadía Méndez honored him by giving him the title "Artista Máximo". The following year, he was appointed as the Colombian consul in Rome. That same year, he held his last showing at the Ibero-American Exposition. He died in Rome. In 1963, his remains and those of his wife were returned to Colombia.

References

Further reading
 Laura María Casas Bonnet, Reflejos de Bogotá 1880-1930: Ricardo Acevedo Bernal, su pintura y su música, Biblioteca Luís Ángel Arango, 2009 
 , Ricardo Acevedo Bernal, Publicaciones de la Escuela Nacional de Bellas Artes, Editorial Cromos, 1934.

External links 
 
 Ricardo Acevedo Bernal by Guillermo Valencia, @ the Museum of Fine Arts, Houston, ICAA 
 Critique of La Tentación a painting by Acevedo Bernal, @ WordPress

1867 births
1930 deaths
People from Bogotá
Colombian photographers
Colombian male songwriters
Colombian diplomats
Académie Julian alumni
19th-century Colombian painters
19th-century male artists
20th-century Colombian painters
20th-century Colombian male artists
Colombian male painters